Euomphalus is a genus of  fossil marine gastropods known to have lived from the Silurian to the Middle Permian.

Description
Euomphalus is characterized by a closely coiled shell with a depressed to slightly elevated spire and a channel-bearing angulation (a selenizone) on the upper surface of the whorls. The lower surface of the whorls is rounded to angular.

Amphiscapha, Philoxene, and Straparollus are among similar related genera. Serpulospira, also related, differs in having a broadly open spiral in the adult form.

Taxonomy 
Euomphalus is the type genus of the family Euomphalidae. Euomphalus pentangulatus (Sowerby, 1814) is its type species.

Species
 Euomphalus pentangulatus Sowerby, 1814(type)
 Euomphalus radiatus Menke, 1850: synonym of Heliacus (Heliacus) areola bicanaliculatus (Valenciennes, 1832) represented as Heliacus areola bicanaliculatus (Valenciennes, 1832)

References 

Euomphalidae
Silurian first appearances
Permian genus extinctions
Paleozoic molluscs of North America
Paleozoic life of Ontario
Paleozoic life of Manitoba
Paleozoic life of the Northwest Territories
Paleozoic life of Nunavut
Silurian gastropods
Devonian gastropods
Carboniferous gastropods
Permian gastropods